Enrico Costa (born 17 June 1971) is an Italian bobsledder who competed from 1994 to the early 2000s. He won a gold medal in the two-man event at the 1999 FIBT World Championships in Cortina d'Ampezzo. Costa also competed at the 1998 Winter Olympics, finishing 14th in the two-man event and 20th in the four-man event.

References
1998 bobsleigh two-man results
1998 bobsleigh four-man results
Bobsleigh two-man world championship medalists since 1931
FIBT profile

External links

1971 births
Bobsledders at the 1998 Winter Olympics
Italian male bobsledders
Living people
Olympic bobsledders of Italy
Bobsledders of Fiamme Oro